Krasnow is a surname. Notable people with the surname include:

Alyaksandr Krasnow (born 1998), Belarusian footballer
Bob Krasnow (1934–2016), American record label executive and entrepreneur
Hecky Krasnow (1910–1984), American record producer
Iris Krasnow (born 1954), American author, professor, and public speaker
Michael Krasnow (1969–1997), American author
Peter Krasnow (1886–1979), Ukrainian-born American painter